José Arlegui (c. 1686-1750) was a Spanish Franciscan theologian of the 18th century, from Biscay, who wrote on theological subjects, some of them related to the ethnology of Mexico.

Life
He was first attached to the Franciscan province of Cantabria, then transferred to Zacatecas in Mexico.

Works
His most important work was the Cronica de Zacatecas, which was published in 1737. He gives an account of the missions in his province, including many reports on the native Americans of Zacatecas. This is a major primary source for them, who are otherwise hardly touched by contemporary published documents, and of the first attempts to convert them to Christianity.

References

Attribution
 The entry cites:
Cronica de la Provincia de Zacatecas, 1737. Very rare. *Beristain de Souza, Biblioteca Hispano-Americana setentrional (Mexico, 1816), I;
Casual mention also in the Documentos para la Historia de Mexico, first and second series.

1680s births
1750 deaths
Spanish Franciscans
18th-century Spanish Roman Catholic theologians